Beloved Infidel is a 1959 DeLuxe Color biographical drama film made by 20th Century Fox in CinemaScope and based on the relationship of F. Scott Fitzgerald and Sheilah Graham. The film was directed by Henry King and produced by Jerry Wald from a screenplay by Sy Bartlett, based on the 1957 memoir by Sheilah Graham and Gerold Frank. The music score was by Franz Waxman, the cinematography by Leon Shamroy and the art direction by Lyle R. Wheeler and Maurice Ransford. The film was the sixth and final collaboration between King and Peck.

The film stars Gregory Peck and Deborah Kerr, with Eddie Albert and Philip Ober.

Plot
Sheilah Graham sails from England to the U.S. and meets with a newspaper editor John Wheeler, telling him of her royal lineage and many connections. He hires her to write a column, and when its blunt and gossipy nature increases its popularity, Sheilah also is offered her own radio program.

She meets acclaimed author F. Scott Fitzgerald at a party at the home of humorist Bob Carter, her friend. An immediate attraction is formed, although Scott is still married to wife Zelda, who has been institutionalized in a psychiatric hospital. To meet financial obligations, Scott has accepted a position in Hollywood writing film scripts, expressing the belief that his novels are no longer of interest.

His excessive drinking affects his mood and his work. Scott is haunted by the memories of Zelda and the success and fun they had together. He learns that a play is being produced in Pasadena based on one of his stories and takes Sheilah to see it, only to discover that it is a production by high school students, some of whom are unaware that the writer is even still alive.

Sheilah copes with his growing alcoholism and tries to leave him until Scott sends a goodbye note, sounding suicidal. She confesses to him that her own past haunts her, everything she claimed to be being a lie: Sheilah actually is a girl from the London slums. She appeals to Scott to write another book, but after he sends in the first four chapters, Scott receives a publisher's letter of rejection.

Sheilah's radio show is based in Chicago, and as she travels there, Scott becomes abusive, first aboard an airplane and then to one of her colleagues. What she doesn't know is that Scott has been fired by the studio, which finds his script work unacceptable. Sheilah continues to stand by him, but eventually Scott's health gives out. He collapses and dies, a forlorn figure of the past.

Cast
 Gregory Peck as F. Scott Fitzgerald
 Deborah Kerr as Sheilah Graham
 Eddie Albert as Bob Carter – Sheilah's friend
 Philip Ober as John Wheeler
 Herbert Rudley as Stan Harris
 John Sutton as Lord Donegall
 Karin Booth as Pierce
 Ken Scott as Robinson
 Elliott Gould as newsboy (uncredited)
 Minta Durfee (uncredited)

See also
 List of American films of 1959

References

External links
 
 
 
 

1959 films
Biographical films about writers
1950s biographical drama films
20th Century Fox films
Films scored by Franz Waxman
Films directed by Henry King
Films based on biographies
Films based on American novels
American biographical drama films
Cultural depictions of F. Scott Fitzgerald
CinemaScope films
1950s English-language films
1950s American films